Noriko Anno (born May 23, 1976 in Fukue, Yamaguchi) is a Japanese judoka who won the gold medal in the women's -78 kg judo at the 2004 Summer Olympics. She has won gold in the World Championship at -78 kg four times, and was fifth in the -72 kg category at the 1996 Summer Olympics.

She married judoka Ryuji Sonoda in 2010.

References

External links
 
 

1976 births
Living people
Japanese female judoka
Olympic judoka of Japan
Olympic gold medalists for Japan
Olympic medalists in judo
Judoka at the 1996 Summer Olympics
Judoka at the 2000 Summer Olympics
Judoka at the 2004 Summer Olympics
Medalists at the 2004 Summer Olympics
Asian Games medalists in judo
Judoka at the 1994 Asian Games
Judoka at the 1998 Asian Games
Sportspeople from Yamaguchi Prefecture
Asian Games gold medalists for Japan
Recipients of the Medal with Purple Ribbon
Medalists at the 1994 Asian Games
Universiade medalists in judo
Universiade gold medalists for Japan
Medalists at the 1995 Summer Universiade
20th-century Japanese women
21st-century Japanese women